The Telephone Hills are a low mountain range in the interior California Coast Ranges, in western Kern County, California.

References 

California Coast Ranges
Mountain ranges of Kern County, California
Mountain ranges of Southern California